Hugh Mackay (December 19, 1887 – December 6, 1957) was a Canadian politician. He served in the Legislative Assembly of New Brunswick as member of the Progressive Conservative party.

References

1887 births
1957 deaths
20th-century Canadian politicians
20th-century Canadian businesspeople
Politicians from Saint John, New Brunswick
Progressive Conservative Party of New Brunswick MLAs